The Selamiut Range is a mountain range on the northernmost tip of Labrador, Canada. It is a subrange of the Torngat Mountains which in turn form part of the southern section of the Arctic Cordillera mountain system.

See also
List of mountain ranges

References

Arctic Cordillera
Mountain ranges of Qikiqtaaluk Region